D532 is a state road in Dalmatia region of Croatia, connecting the A1 motorway in Zagvozd interchange, to Baška Voda at the Adriatic coast and  D8 state road (to the south) and D62 state road immediately to the north of the motorway.

The most significant structure on the D532 route is Sveti Ilija Tunnel through Biokovo mountain. The tunnel was  excavated in 2010 and completed in 2013.

The road, as well as all other state roads in Croatia, is managed and maintained by Hrvatske ceste, state owned company.

Traffic volume 

The D532 state road traffic volume is not reported by Hrvatske ceste. However, they regularly count and report traffic volume on the A1 motorway Zagvozd interchange, which connects to the D532 road only, thus permitting the D532 road traffic volume to be accurately calculated. The report includes no information on ASDT volumes.

Road junctions and populated areas

See also
 Hrvatske autoceste

Sources

External links 
 Motorways-exits of D532

State roads in Croatia
Transport in Split-Dalmatia County